Hilary Carol Cruz (born December 4, 1988) is an American actress, model and beauty queen who won Miss Teen USA 2007.

Biography
Cruz graduated from Centaurus High School in 2007 and was going to attend the University of Northern Colorado but chose to put those plans on hold after winning the national title.

Miss Colorado Teen USA
Hilary Cruz was crowned Miss Colorado Teen USA 2007 in 2006, gaining the right to represent the state of Colorado in the national televised pageant of Miss Teen USA 2007

Miss Teen USA
In 2007, Cruz represented Colorado in the Miss Teen USA 2007 pageant held in Pasadena, California in August 2007.  During the live television broadcast on August 24, 2007, Cruz was crowned Miss Teen USA 2007 by outgoing titleholder Katie Blair. She was the first titleholder from Colorado in the history of Miss Teen USA and Miss USA.  She was the first titleholder from Colorado to place since 1998, and only the fourth to record a placement.

References

External links

Miss Colorado Teen USA official website
Miss Teen USA official profile

1988 births
Living people
People from Louisville, Colorado
Miss Teen USA winners
American beauty pageant winners
American people of Mexican descent
2007 beauty pageant contestants
21st-century Miss Teen USA delegates
Participants in American reality television series